Sodium-hydrogen exchange regulatory cofactor NHE-RF2 (NHERF-2) also known as tyrosine kinase activator protein 1 (TKA-1) or SRY-interacting protein 1 (SIP-1) is a protein that in humans is encoded by the SLC9A3R2 (solute carrier family 9 isoform A3 regulatory factor 2) gene.

NHERF-2 is a scaffold protein that connects plasma membrane proteins with members of the ezrin/moesin/radixin family and thereby helps to link them to the actin cytoskeleton and to regulate their surface expression. It is necessary for cAMP-mediated phosphorylation and inhibition of SLC9A3. In addition, it may also act as scaffold protein in the nucleus.

Function 

This regulatory protein (factor) interacts with a sodium/hydrogen exchanger NHE3 (SLC9A3) in the brush border membrane of the proximal tubule, small intestine, and colon that plays a major role in transepithelial sodium absorption. SLC9A3R2, as well as SLC9A3R1 and protein kinase A phosphorylation, may play a role in NHE3 regulation.

Interactions
Sodium-hydrogen exchange regulatory cofactor 2 has been shown to interact with SGK, Actinin alpha 4, Parathyroid hormone receptor 1, Phosphoinositide-dependent kinase-1, EZR, PODXL, Cystic fibrosis transmembrane conductance regulator and PLCB3.

See also
 Solute carrier family

References

Further reading

External links 
 

Solute carrier family
Membrane proteins